Sheep Creek is a stream in the U.S. state of South Dakota. It is a tributary of the North Fork Moreau River.

Sheep Creek was named after nearby Sheep Mountain.

See also
List of rivers of South Dakota

References

Rivers of Harding County, South Dakota
Rivers of Perkins County, South Dakota
Rivers of South Dakota